The Central District of Salas-e Babajani County is a district (bakhsh) in Salas-e Babajani County, Kermanshah Province, Iran. At the 2006 census, its population was 29,931, in 6,346 families.  The District has one city: Tazehabad. The District has three rural districts (dehestan): Dasht-e Hor Rural District, Khaneh Shur Rural District, and Zamkan Rural District.

References 

Salas-e Babajani County
Districts of Kermanshah Province